The Aden Street riots took place in early 1967 during the Aden Emergency. On 19-20 January 1967 the NLF prompted street rioting in Aden. The Aden police lost control, so British High Commissioner Sir Richard Turnbull deployed British troops to crush the riots. This was followed by pro-FLOSY rioters taking to the streets which then led to conflict with British troops until February. The mood created by the riots helped lead to the Arab Police mutiny.

There had previously been riots in Aden in October 1965.

References

External links
Aden Emergency at the Argylls Website
Conflicts in 1967
Wars involving the United Kingdom
Aden Emergency
January 1967 events in Asia
February 1967 events in Asia
1967 in the Federation of South Arabia